Saint John of Shanghai and San Francisco (secular name Mikhail Borisovich Maximovitch, ; 4 June 1896 – 2 July 1966) was a prominent Eastern Orthodox ascetic and hierarch of the Russian Orthodox Church Outside Russia (ROCOR) who was active in the mid-20th century. He was a pastor and spiritual father of high reputation and a reputed wonderworker to whom were attributed powers of prophecy, clairvoyance and healing. He is often referred to as "St. John the Wonderworker".

Life

Early life
Mikhail Maximovitch was born in 1896 in the village of Adamovka of the Izyumsky Uyezd of the Kharkov Governorate of the Russian Empire (in present-day eastern Ukraine).

Growing up Mikhail was a sickly child who was deeply devout and used to collect icons and church books. He was captivated by the lives of saints; even in play he would pretend toy soldiers were monks and fortresses were  monasteries. His piety  impressed his French caretaker so much that she converted from Catholicism to Orthodox Christianity.

Maximovitch attended Poltava Military School from 1907 to 1914. Later he attended and received a degree in law from Kharkov Imperial University in 1918. He studied well and attended church in Kharkiv, where he was inspired by metropolitan Antony Khrapovitsky to go deeper into his spiritual learnings.

He later recalled that the local monastery had become more important in his life than the secular institutions. 
Maximovitch was a patriot of his fatherland and was profoundly disappointed by what he saw as human weakness and impermanence during the tragic events of the 1917 revolution. As a result, he made the decision to dedicate his life to serving God.

Yugoslavia
His family sought refuge in Yugoslavia and brought him to Belgrade in 1921. In 1925 he graduated from Belgrade University with a degree in theology. To support his impoverished family, he would sell newspapers.
 
In 1926 he was tonsured a monk and ordained a hierodeacon by Russian Metropolitan Anthony (Khrapovitsky), who gave him the name of John after his saintly relative.

Later that same year, he was ordained to the priesthood by Russian Bishop Gabriel (Chepur) of Chelyabinsk. Once ordained St. John would no longer sleep in a bed. He would nap in a chair or kneeling down in front of the icons, praying. He ate only once a day. For several years  he worked as an instructor and tutor in Yugoslavia. He worked as a religious teacher in the Gymnasium of Velika Kikinda between 1925 and 1927. 
In 1929, the Holy Synod of the Serbian Orthodox Church appointed him a teacher of the seminary in Bitola under principal Nikolaj Velimirović.
John earned the respect and devotion at the seminary where he taught. His reputation grew as he started visiting hospitals, caring for patients with prayer and communion.

Shanghai
In 1934 he was ordained a bishop of the Russian Orthodox Church Outside Russia by Metropolitan Anthony and assigned to the diocese of Shanghai.
In Shanghai, bishop John found an uncompleted cathedral and an Orthodox community deeply divided along ethnic lines. Making contact with all the various groups, he quickly became involved in local charitable institutions and also founded an orphanage and home for the children of the destitute.

He set about restoring church unity, establishing ties with local Orthodox Serbs and Greeks. Here he first became known for miracles attributed to his prayer.

As a public figure, it was impossible for him to completely conceal his ascetic way of life. During the Japanese occupation, even when he routinely ignored the curfew in pursuit of his pastoral activities, the Japanese authorities never harassed him.

As the only Russian hierarch in China who refused to submit to the authority of the Soviet-dominated Russian Orthodox Church under Patriarch Alexy I of Moscow, he was elevated in 1946 to Archbishop of China by the Holy Synod of the Russian Orthodox Church Outside Russia.

When the Communists took power in China in 1949, the Russian colony was forced to flee, first to a refugee camp on the island of Tubabao in the Philippines and then mainly to the United States and Australia. Archbishop St. John personally traveled to Washington, D.C., to ensure that his people would be allowed to enter the US.

Western Europe
In 1951, St. John was assigned to the Archdiocese of Western Europe with his see first in Paris, then in Brussels.

Thanks to his work in compiling the lives of saints, numerous pre-Schism Western saints became known in Orthodoxy and continue to be venerated to this day. His charitable and pastoral work continued as it had in Shanghai, even among a much more widely scattered flock.

San Francisco
In 1962 St. John was reassigned by the Holy Synod to the see of San Francisco. Here too, he found a divided community and a cathedral in an unfinished state. Although he completed the building of the Holy Virgin Cathedral and brought some measure of peace to the community, he became the target of slander from political enemies. They filed a lawsuit against him for alleged mishandling of finances related to the construction of the cathedral. He was exonerated, but this was a great cause of sorrow to him in his later life.

Deeply reverent of St. John of Kronstadt, John played an active role in the preparation of his canonization in 1964.

Death and veneration
On July 2, 1966 (June 19 on the Julian calendar), St. John died while visiting Seattle, at a time and place he was said to have foretold. He was entombed in a sepulcher beneath the altar of the Holy Virgin Cathedral he had built in San Francisco. It is dedicated to the Theotokos, Joy of All Who Sorrow, and located on Geary Boulevard in the Richmond district.

In 1994, he was solemnly glorified on the 28th anniversary of his death. His unembalmed, incorrupt relics occupy a shrine in the cathedral's nave. His feast day is celebrated on the Saturday nearest to July 2.

He is beloved and celebrated worldwide, with portions of his relics located in Serbia, Russia, Mount Athos, Greece (Church of Saint Anna in Katerini), South Korea, Bulgaria, Romania, United States (St. John Maximovitch Church, Eugene, Oregon and St. Innocent Orthodox Church, Redford, Michigan), Canada (Holy Trinity Serbian Orthodox Church, Kitchener), England (Dormition Cathedral of the Russian Orthodox Church, London) and other countries of the world.

References

Further reading
Dunlop, John B. (2017). Exodus: St. John Maximovitch Leads His Flock out of Shanghai. Yonkers: St Vladimir's Seminary Press.  
Perekrestov, Archpriest Peter. (1994). Man of God: Saint John of Shanghai & San Francisco. Redding: Nikodemos Orthodox Publication Society. 
Rose, Fr. Seraphim & Abbot Herman. (1987). Blessed John the wonderworker: A preliminary account of the life and miracles of Archbishop John Maximovitch (Third, revised ed.). Platina: St. Herman of Alaska Brotherhood. .
Father Seraphim: His Life and Work .

External links

Virtual tour of Holy Virgin Cathedral in San Francisco (location of some of his relics)
Saint John The Wonderworker Church
Official report on the uncovering of the relics
Life, Miracles and Sermons of St. John, by Bishop Alexander (Mileant)
San Francisco Russian Orthodox Cathedral Mother of God "Joy of All Who Sorrow"
St John of Shanghai parish Belfast, Northern Ireland: https://stjohnofshanghaibelfast.org/

1896 births
1966 deaths
People from Donetsk Oblast
People from Izyumsky Uyezd
20th-century Christian saints
20th-century Eastern Orthodox archbishops
20th-century Christian mystics
Bishops of the Russian Orthodox Church Outside of Russia
American saints of the Eastern Orthodox Church
Chinese saints of the Eastern Orthodox Church
Russian saints of the Eastern Orthodox Church
Eastern Orthodox mystics
Eastern Orthodox theologians
Miracle workers
Christianity in Shanghai
Christianity in San Francisco
Religious leaders from the San Francisco Bay Area
People from the Russian Empire of Serbian descent
Russian expatriates in the Philippines
White Russian emigrants to Yugoslavia
White Russian emigrants to China
White Russian emigrants to the United States
National University of Kharkiv alumni
University of Belgrade Faculty of Orthodox Theology alumni
Burials in California